Hayden Garrett Moss (born May 27, 1986), is a reality TV personality from Mesa, Arizona. He was the winner of the reality TV show Big Brother 12.  He subsequently competed on Survivor: Blood vs. Water with his then-girlfriend, Survivor: One World contestant Kat Edorsson; Moss finished the show in 7th place.

Big Brother
On the show, he was part of "The Brigade" alliance, along with Enzo, Matt, and Lane. His nickname within his alliance was "The Animal." He describes himself as "outgoing, athletic and charming." His favorite activities include "snowboarding, weightlifting, working out, going to the beach and hanging out with friends."

Hayden won Big Brother 12 by a jury vote of 4-3, awarding him the $500,000 prize.

Survivor

In 2013, Moss was a contestant on Survivor: Blood vs. Water, the 27th season of Survivor, along with his girlfriend Kat Edorsson, who had previously competed on the show's 24th season, Survivor: One World.  He was the first Big Brother player to compete on Survivor, followed by Big Brother 16 contestant Caleb Reynolds, who was a contestant on Survivor: Kaoh Rong, the 32nd season of Survivor. Caleb later returned for Survivor: Game Changers.

Moss was initially placed on the Tadhana tribe along with the game's other new players. Edorsson was voted out while the two were on separate tribes; yet when presented with the option to allow her to take his place in the game, he stayed put on his tribe and she was eliminated after placing last in a challenge. After a tribe swap, Moss remained on the Tadhana tribe, along with fellow newcomers Caleb Bankston and Ciera Eastin, while being joined by returning players Tyson Apostol, Gervase Peterson, and Aras Baskauskas. Together, under Apostol's leadership, everyone on the tribe, except for Baskauskas, formed an alliance, under the common bond of having their loved ones voted out already. At the merge, the core alliance of five stayed together and successfully eliminated Baskauskas and his brother Vytas, as well as Tina Wesson, and Eastin's mother Laura Morett (for the second time). However, at the urging of Bankston, Moss decided that it was best to attempt to overthrow Apostol as a clear threat. Their first attempt failed, since they were unable to convince Eastin to flip against Apostol, and when the two of them, along with Wesson's daughter Katie Collins, attempted to vote out Eastin, Bankston was eliminated instead. With Bankston gone, Moss took control of the outsiders' alliance and finally convinced Eastin to vote with him and Collins against Monica Culpepper. However, this resulted in a stalemate of two consecutive tied votes, which led to Collins' elimination after a rock draw. With no one else left to turn to, Moss and Eastin tried to convince Culpepper to join them in eliminating Peterson as a final effort against Apostol, but she refused. Moss was voted out at the Final Five, and after losing the Redemption Island duel, he became the fourteenth person eliminated from Survivor: Blood vs. Water came in seventh place as the fifth jury member. Eastin was eliminated next, completely ending Moss's alliance. In the Final Tribal Council, Moss voted Apostol as the winner.

Filmography

Television

References

Big Brother (American TV series) winners
Survivor (American TV series) contestants
People from Mesa, Arizona
1986 births
Living people